Gurli is a Scandinavian given name for females. Notable people named Gurli include:

 Gurli Ewerlund (1902–1985), Swedish swimmer
 Gurli Vibe Jensen (1924–2016), Danish missionary, priest and writer
 Gurli Linder (1865–1947), Swedish writer
 Gurli Åberg (1843–1922), Swedish actress

See also:
 Gwili Andre (1907–1959), Danish model and actress, born Gurli Andresen

Scandinavian feminine given names
Danish feminine given names
Swedish feminine given names